Reliquary is the 1997 New York Times best-selling sequel to Relic, by American authors Douglas Preston and Lincoln Child. The legacy of the blood-maddened Mbwun lives on in Reliquary, but the focus is shifted from the original museum setting to the tunnels beneath the streets of New York City. The book is the second in the Special Agent Pendergast series.

Plot summary
The story picks up where the epilogue of Relic left off. Two headless skeletons are found in the Humboldt Kill.  When further decapitated bodies follow, there is suspicion of a second Mbwun monster. Major characters from the original book team up with new ones to solve the puzzle. The mystery soon leads underground to the Mole people, and even deeper towards enigmatic beings called the Wrinklers. In the end, it is revealed that the Wrinklers are led by Frock, who has refined a modified version of the Mbwun plant, created by Kawakita to regain the use of his legs. Kawakita also gave the drug to the people who were to become the Wrinklers, later made into his tribe by Frock. After going underground, the group kills them with an explosion, vitamin D infused water and a flood.

Characters
Many major characters from Relic return:
 Police Captain Vincent D'Agosta - New York Police Department, initially in charge of the investigation.
 Dr. Margo Green - now assistant curator of the New York Museum of Natural History
 A. X. L. Pendergast - Special Agent for the FBI
 Bill Smithback - journalist, now crime reporter working for the New York Post
 Dr. Whitney C. Frock - Margo Green's former PhD mentor, evolutionary biologist, retired from the museum.
 Dr. Ian Dunbar- D'Agosta's FBI protector

New Characters:
 Sergeant Laura Hayward - New York police officer who worked on a unit to roust the homeless; a published author working on her master's degree in Sociology at New York University and an expert on the underground societies of New York.  The second and third sections of the novel are preceded by excerpts from a paper she wrote that is awaiting publication.  Later appears in the Preston & Child novels Brimstone, Dance of Death, The Book of the Dead and Fever Dream.  In the years between Reliquary and Brimstone Hayward is promoted to captain.
 Captain Jack Waxie - D'Agosta's superior; takes over the investigation
 Anette Wisher - mother of murdered socialite Pamela Wisher, who then leads a crusade to save the city from crime.
 Redmond Horlocker - Chief of the New York Police Department
 Mephisto - the leader of an underground community beneath Central Park
 Dr. Simon Brambell - Chief Medical Examiner (his brother appears in other novels by Preston & Child)
 Bryce Harriman - crime reporter for The New York Times; Smithback's rival

References

External links
Official Douglas Preston/Lincoln Child website

Techno-thriller novels
1997 American novels
Sequel novels
American thriller novels
Novels by Douglas Preston
Novels by Lincoln Child
Collaborative novels
Novels set in New York City
Tor Books books